Pender's Store is a historic site in Greenwood, Florida. It is located near the junction of SR 69 and 71. On May 3, 1974, it was added to the U.S. National Register of Historic Places.

References

External links
 Jackson County listings at National Register of Historic Places
 Florida's Office of Cultural and Historical Programs
 Jackson County listings
 Jackson County markers
 Pender's Store

Commercial buildings on the National Register of Historic Places in Florida
Buildings and structures in Jackson County, Florida
Vernacular architecture in Florida
National Register of Historic Places in Jackson County, Florida